was a Japanese physician. In 1941 he began his long working association with St. Luke's International Hospital in central Tokyo and worked as a medical doctor throughout the wartime firebombing of the city. From 1990 he served as the hospital's honorary director. He was also Sophia University's Grief Care Institute director emeritus. He was honorary chairman of the Foundation Sasakawa Memorial Health Cooperation. Hinohara is credited with establishing and popularizing Japan's practice of annual medical checkups.

Biography 
Hinohara was born in Yoshiki District, Yamaguchi Prefecture and graduated from the school of medicine at Kyoto Imperial University in 1937.

During his career Hinohara was known for working during many medical emergencies such as the firebombing of Tokyo during World War II and the Tokyo subway sarin attack. He was also on Japan Airlines Flight 351 when it was hijacked by the Japanese Red Army Faction.

Hinohara became an honorary member of the Japanese Cardiovascular Society and received the Second Prize and the Order of Culture. He was honored by Kyoto Imperial University, Thomas Jefferson University and by McMaster University by receiving an honorary doctorate.

Hinohara died on 18 July 2017 in Tokyo at the age of 105.

See also
 List of centenarians (medical professionals)

References

External links

About Shigeaki Hinohara United States Ambassador to Japan
Biography: Shigeaki Hinohara
 

1911 births
2017 deaths
Japanese surgeons
Japanese centenarians
Men centenarians
People from Yamaguchi Prefecture
Recipients of the Order of Culture
Kyoto University alumni
Emory University School of Medicine alumni
Japanese healthcare managers
Hijacking survivors